All You Can Eat Buddha is a 2017 French-language Canadian fantasy black comedy film directed by Ian Lagarde. It was screened in the Discovery section at the 2017 Toronto International Film Festival. The film centres on Mike, a mysterious guest at a vacation resort in Cuba who appears to have the ability to perform miracles.

Cast
 David La Haye as Jean-Pierre Villeneuve / J-P Newtown
 Richard Jutras as Bert
 Ludovic Berthillot as Mike
 Sylvio Arriola as Valentino
 Yaité Ruiz as Esmeralda
 Alexander Guerrero as Santiago

Accolades
The film received six Canadian Screen Award nominations at the 6th Canadian Screen Awards in 2018.

References

External links
 

2017 films
2017 black comedy films
2010s French-language films
Canadian black comedy films
Canadian fantasy films
2017 fantasy films
Films set in Cuba
French-language Canadian films
2010s Canadian films